Mirzapur Union is a union parishad of Shailkupa Upazila, in Jhenaidah District, Khulna Division of Bangladesh. There are 27 villages and 15 mouzas in the union.

References

External links
 

Unions of Khulna Division
Unions of Shailkupa Upazila
Unions of Jhenaidah District